The Libertarian Party of Arkansas (LPAR) is the Arkansas affiliate of the national Libertarian Party (LP). In the 2010s the party saw increased support in federal races due to a lack of Democratic candidates contesting those races.

History

In 2002 members of the party petitioned to place Amendment 3, a ballot initiative that would have eliminated taxes on food and medicine, but it was overwhelming rejected by 61% to 39%. However, the sales tax on food was later phased out through the passage of a bill following the amendment's defeat.

Electoral performance

Presidential

Senate Class II

Senate Class III

Gubernatorial

House

See also
 Political party strength in Arkansas

References

External links
 Libertarian Party of Arkansas

Arkansas
Political parties in Arkansas
Political parties established in 1971